Baptist End railway station was a station on the former Great Western Railway's  Bumble Hole Line between  and .

It opened in 1905 and closed in 1964, as part of the Beeching Axe. The railway which passed through the site had closed completely within four years of the station's closure, and the track was removed soon afterwards. Nature has since reclaimed the section of the railway which passed through the site of the station.

References

Further reading

Disused railway stations in Dudley
Railway stations in Great Britain opened in 1905
Railway stations in Great Britain closed in 1964
Beeching closures in England
Former Great Western Railway stations